Pierce County is a county in the U.S. state of North Dakota. As of the 2020 census, the population was 3,990. Its county seat is Rugby.

History
The Dakota Territory legislature created the county on March 11, 1887, with areas partitioned from Bottineau, Rolette, McHenry and the now-extinct DeSmet counties. It was named for Gilbert A. Pierce, a Dakotas political figure. The county was not organized at that time, nor was it attached to another county for administrative or judicial purposes. It was attached to McHenry County on February 4, 1889, but that lasted only two months; on April 6 the county government was effected and the attachment to McHenry was terminated.

The county's boundaries were enlarged on November 8, 1892, when Church County was dissolved and a portion of its territory was annexed into Pierce.

The geographical center of North America is in Pierce County, approximately six miles (10 km) west of Balta. Rugby has a monument for the center at the intersection of U.S. 2 and N.D. 3.

Geography
The North Fork of the Sheyenne River flows easterly through central Pierce County. The county terrain consists of rolling hills, mostly devoted to agriculture. The terrain generally slopes to the north and east, with its highest point a hill near the SW county corner, at 1,634' (498m) ASL.

Major highways

  U.S. Highway 2
  U.S. Highway 52
  North Dakota Highway 3
  North Dakota Highway 17
  North Dakota Highway 19
  North Dakota Highway 60

Adjacent counties

 Rolette County - north
 Towner County - northeast
 Benson County - east
 Wells County - southeast
 Sheridan County - southwest
 McHenry County - west
 Bottineau County - northwest

Protected areas

 Boyer National Wildlife Refuge
 Buffalo Lake National Wildlife Refuge
 Hurricane Lake National Wildlife Refuge
 Meyer Township National Wildlife Refuge

Lakes

 Antelope Lakes
 Aylmer Lake (part)
 Battema Lake
 Buffalo Lake
 Clear Lake
 Davis Lake
 Girard Lake
 Goose Lake
 Gunderson Lake
 Guss Lake
 Horseshoe Lake
 Kilgore Lake
 Lesmeister Lake
 Long Lake
 Petrified Lake
 Ranch Lake
 Round Lake
 Sand Lake
 Smoky Lake (part)
 Twin Lakes (part)

Demographics

2000 census
As of the 2000 census, there were 4,675 people, 1,964 households, and 1,276 families in the county. The population density was 4.59/sqmi (1.77/km2). There were 2,269 housing units at an average density of 2.23/sqmi (0.86/km2). The racial makeup of the county was 98.50% White, 0.11% Black or African American, 0.68% Native American, 0.26% Asian, 0.04% from other races, and 0.41% from two or more races. 0.60% of the population were Hispanic or Latino of any race. 47.7% were of German and 32.7% Norwegian ancestry.

There were 1,964 households, out of which 28.20% had children under the age of 18 living with them, 56.40% were married couples living together, 6.30% had a female householder with no husband present, and 35.00% were non-families. 32.00% of all households were made up of individuals, and 17.10% had someone living alone who was 65 years of age or older. The average household size was 2.31 and the average family size was 2.94.

The county population contained 23.90% under the age of 18, 5.50% from 18 to 24, 23.90% from 25 to 44, 22.70% from 45 to 64, and 24.10% who were 65 years of age or older. The median age was 43 years. For every 100 females there were 96.60 males. For every 100 females age 18 and over, there were 92.50 males.

The median income for a household in the county was $26,524, and the median income for a family was $34,412. Males had a median income of $25,037 versus $16,946 for females. The per capita income for the county was $14,055. About 9.30% of families and 12.50% of the population were below the poverty line, including 12.40% of those under age 18 and 17.00% of those age 65 or over.

2010 census
As of the 2010 census, there were 4,357 people, 1,835 households, and 1,145 families in the county. The population density was 4.28/sqmi (1.65/km2). There were 2,199 housing units at an average density of 2.16/sqmi (0.83/km2). The racial makeup of the county was 94.1% white, 3.9% American Indian, 0.5% black or African American, 0.1% Asian, 0.7% from other races, and 0.8% from two or more races. Those of Hispanic or Latino origin made up 1.0% of the population. In terms of ancestry, 52.3% were German, 34.5% were Norwegian, 5.5% were Irish, and 2.0% were American.

Of the 1,835 households, 24.5% had children under the age of 18 living with them, 52.8% were married couples living together, 5.9% had a female householder with no husband present, 37.6% were non-families, and 34.3% of all households were made up of individuals. The average household size was 2.23 and the average family size was 2.86. The median age was 46.9 years.

The median income for a household in the county was $37,091 and the median income for a family was $55,304. Males had a median income of $39,511 versus $21,811 for females. The per capita income for the county was $18,575. About 6.4% of families and 12.9% of the population were below the poverty line, including 11.2% of those under age 18 and 19.2% of those age 65 or over.

Communities

Cities
 Balta
 Rugby (county seat)
 Wolford

Census-designated places
 Barton
 Orrin
 Selz

Unincorporated communities
 Leverich
 Silva
 Tunbridge

Townships

 Alexanter
 Antelope Lake
 Balta
 Elling
 Elverum
 Hagel
 Jefferson
 Meyer
 Ness
 Reno Valley
 Rush Lake
 Torgerson
 Truman
 Tuscarora
 White

Politics
Pierce County voters have tended to vote Republican for decades. In only one national election since 1964 has the county selected the Democratic Party candidate (as of 2020).

Education
School districts include:

 Anamoose Public School District 14
 Bottineau Public School District 1
 Harvey Public School District 38
 Leeds Public School District 6
 Maddock Public School District 9
 North Star School District
 Rugby Public School District 5
 Towner-Granville-Upham Public School District 60

Former districts:
 Wolford Public School District 1 - Closed in 2019

See also
 National Register of Historic Places listings in Pierce County ND

References

External links
 A history of Pierce County (1936) from the Digital Horizons website
 Fifty years in Pierce county (1943) from the Digital Horizons website
 Pierce County maps, Sheet 1 (northern) and Sheet 2 (southern), North Dakota DOT

 
1889 establishments in Dakota Territory
Populated places established in 1889